Lodrino is a village and comune in the province of Brescia, in Lombardy, Italy.  Neighbouring communes are Casto, Marcheno, Marmentino, Pertica Alta and Tavernole sul Mella. It is situated between the Trompia valley and Val Sabbia.

References

Cities and towns in Lombardy